Vienna Blood may refer to

 Wiener Blut (waltz), by Johan Strauss II, Op.354
 Wiener Blut (operetta), named after the waltz
 Vienna Blood (film), 1942 German film based on the operetta
 Vienna Blood (TV series), British-Austrian crime drama television series